Fossil Fighters: Frontier is a 2014 video game developed by Spike Chunsoft, with assistance from Red Entertainment and Cyclone Zero, and published by Nintendo for the Nintendo 3DS console. The game is the third title in the Fossil Fighters series, and the first on the Nintendo 3DS. It was released in Japan on February 27, 2014, then in 2015 for North America on March 20 and on May 29 for Europe, making it the first installment of the series to be officially released in that part of the world.

Plot
The story starts with an incident that is referred to throughout the game. In it, INTERFOL agent Stryker has cornered the brilliant but terribly malicious scientist Dr. Baron von Blackraven in his submarine lair. Since Blackraven has no intention of being arrested quietly, a Fossil Battle ensues, with Stryker winning when his vivosaur defeats Blackraven's corrupted vivosaur with a terribly powerful attack. Just as Stryker prepares to take Blackraven into custody, however, he sees something horrible.

Five years later, Stryker becomes the head of the Wardens, an INTERFOL department of Fossil Fighters which travels the world investigating vivosaur activity. Eight teenagers arrive at the Warden HQ in Fossil Park Asia to take the final test to become Wardens themselves, having shown promise in earlier tests. One of the youths, the protagonist, has held a lifelong dream of joining INTERFOL. After the driving lesson, where the protagonist also learns how to excavate fossils and jewels, they are called over by Nate, one of their fellow recruits. Nate meddles with some machinery at the HQ's laboratory and releases a small and odd looking vivosaur. The pair chase it down, but the vivosaur runs into a rogue Gorgo. Ignoring Nate's call to back off, the protagonist battles the Gorgo, but is overwhelmed and only saved by Stryker's timely intervention. After this, the eight recruits are paired up for the final test. The protagonist's partner is an overweight young man named Roland, and at his suggestion, the two leave Fossil Park Asia to prepare for the test.

Development
The game was first announced for North America at E3 2014.

Gameplay
Players navigate the various dig sites using a vehicle called a Bone Buggy, which can be customized. Out on the dig sites, they can find Fossils and turn them into dinosaur-like monsters called Vivosaurs, which can be used in competitive three on three fights via Local Play or online. Unlike in the previous two installments, the player can encounter wild Vivosaurs instead of battling other Fossil Fighters in dig sites. The battle system also differs from that of Fossil Fighters and Fossil Fighters: Champions in that the player is only allowed to control one Vivosaur on their team at a time while the other two are controlled by CPU partners called "Paleo Pals"; instead of being based around the position of the Vivosaurs in the field like in the previous two titles, the battles revolve around 
how it stands, with each vivosaur having different strong and weak stances.

Reception 
Fossil Fighters: Frontier received "mixed or average" reviews according to review aggregator Metacritic.

Notes

References

External links
 
 
  

2014 video games
Dinosaurs in video games
Fossil Fighters
Multiplayer and single-player video games
Nintendo 3DS eShop games
Nintendo 3DS games
Nintendo 3DS-only games
Nintendo Network games
Red Entertainment games
Role-playing video games
Spike Chunsoft video games
Video games developed in Japan